Sluiter is a Dutch surname. Variants are Sluiters, Sluijter(s) and Sluyter(s). Literally meaning "one who closes", it is an occupational surname, originating from people with the profession of doorkeeper, gateman, warden, jailor, etc. Notable people with the surname include:

Sluiter
 (1854–1933), Dutch biologist and anatomist
Ineke Sluiter (born 1959), Dutch classicist
Raemon Sluiter (born 1978), Dutch tennis player
Tim Sluiter (born 1989), Dutch golfer
Willy Sluiter (1873-1949), Dutch painter
Sluijter
Ad Sluijter (born 1981), Dutch guitarist
Jeroen Sluijter (born 1975), Dutch baseball player
Menno Sluijter (born 1932), Dutch anaesthetist
Pem Sluijter (1939–2007), Dutch poet
Thijs Sluijter (born 1980), Dutch footballer
Sluyter
Andrew Sluyter (born 1958), American social scientist and geographer
 (born 1967), Dutch model and television presenter
Sluijters/Sluyters
Iso Sluijters (born 1990), Dutch handball player
Jan Sluijters (1881–1957), Dutch painter

References

Dutch-language surnames
Occupational surnames